The 2005 Kentucky Wildcats football team represented the University of Kentucky during the 2005 NCAA Division I-A football season. They participated as members of the Southeastern Conference in the Eastern Division. They played their home games at Commonwealth Stadium in Lexington, Kentucky. The team was coached by Rich Brooks.

Schedule

References

Kentucky
Kentucky Wildcats football seasons
Kentucky Wildcats football